Hotel Annabella is a 3-stars hotel in the spa town Balatonfüred near the Lake Balaton. The hotel is a part of the Danubius Hotels Group.

Beside the private Lake Balaton beach, the hotel offers views on the Tihany historic village.

References

External links 
Homepage
Location on Google Maps.

Hotels in Balatonfüred
Lake Balaton